OYAP Trust, formerly the Oxfordshire Youth Arts Partnership, is a UK-based charity involved in the education of young people through participation in the arts. The trust aims to develop skills, confidence and self-esteem and give vulnerable young people access to mainstream education, arts and training opportunities.

OYAP Trust works with young people to create a brighter future for communities. It exists to enable young people to reach their potential. With OYAP young people engage in positive life enhancing creative activities as a route to learning and self-development. OYAP uses creativity as a tool for young people to explore and demonstrate their own talents and abilities. OYAP Trust specialises in working with the most vulnerable and hard to reach 11- to 25-year-olds.

Projects like Pimp My Bike, Stepping Up and Pop Choir increase confidence, life skills, leadership and self-esteem. Young people receive recognition for their creativity through performance, exhibitions and the Arts Award qualification.

OYAP help young people use their creativity as a catalyst for change in their own lives and in their communities and has an established track record of working with Looked After Children, young people with learning disabilities and young offenders. The trust supports young people who are suffering from multiple disadvantage be it isolation due to income, geography, a lack of educational opportunity or family support.

Oxfordshire Youth Arts Partnership began in 1998 as the development agency for youth arts in Oxfordshire. The organisation grew from a local authority funded post focusing on the development of youth arts to an independent charity in 2005.

OYAP Trust is considered a key strategic sector leader, and champion of youth arts in the South East. OYAP Trust is Lead Regional Training Agency in the South East for the Arts Award, and representative for the South East on the English National Youth Arts Network's (ENYAN) national steering group.

References

External links
 
Registered charity

Arts organisations based in the United Kingdom
Youth organisations based in England
Charities based in Oxfordshire
Culture in Oxfordshire